The First Unitarian Church is a historic Gothic Revival-styled church built in 1891–92 in Milwaukee, Wisconsin. It was added to the National Register of Historic Places in 1974.

First Unitarian's congregation hired the firm of Ferry & Clas of Milwaukee to design their new church building, and Ferry himself led the design - in reserved Gothic Revival style. Most walls are rock-faced Bedford limestone, rising to steep gable roofs with dormers. The general floor-plan is L-shaped, with a tower rising from one leg of the L.

Inside, the auditorium has a hammerbeam ceiling resting on carved stone corbels. The chancel contains an organ, a pulpit, and a carved oak sedilia. The windows have abstract designs.

The church is little changed from when it was built. First Unitarian was placed on the NRHP for its architectural significance, but it is also the oldest Unitarian church building in Milwaukee.

References

Churches on the National Register of Historic Places in Wisconsin
Unitarian Universalist churches in Wisconsin
Churches in Milwaukee
Gothic Revival church buildings in Wisconsin
Churches completed in 1891
National Register of Historic Places in Milwaukee
1891 establishments in Wisconsin